Quilcapuncu District is one of five districts of the San Antonio de Putina Province in Peru.

History 
Quilcapuncu District was created in November 26, 1986, in Alan García's term.

Geography 
Other mountains are listed below:

Authorities

Mayors 
 2011–2014: Marino Catacora Ticona. 
 2007–2010: Leonardo Lipa Alvarez.

Festivities 
 May: Holy Cross
 June: Anthony of Padua.

See also 
 Administrative divisions of Peru

References

External links 

 Official web site
 INEI Peru